Portulaca suffrutescens, the shrubby purslane, is a plant species native to the southwestern United States and northern and central Mexico. It has been found in Arizona, New Mexico, Texas, Sonora, Chihuahua, Sinaloa, Durango, Querétaro and Guerrero.

Portulaca suffrutescens is a perennial with tuberous roots. Stems are stiff, erect, up to 30 cm (12 inches) tall. Leaves are needle-like, round in cross-section, up to 3 cm (1.2 inches) long. Flowers are orange, copper or bronze, up to 25 mm (1 inch) across. Seeds are black with a row of small bumps along one side.

References

suffrutescens
Flora of Arizona
Flora of Guerrero
Flora of New Mexico
Flora of Sinaloa
Flora of Sonora
Flora of Texas
Plants described in 1881
Taxa named by George Engelmann